Double belt, double champion (or simultaneous champion in cases where the belts are won without abandoning or losing the other) is an achievement made by MMA fighters in several categories.

Controversies
Some sports experts argue that a double championship could be detrimental to the divisions that the champion competes in. The progression of the divisions may be blocked, which can be considered unfair to other challengers. This can be due to the fact that MMA athletes cannot compete in short periods of time (except for rare circumstances, such as fights that end quickly and/or without injury) and must have adequate time for recovery and training camp. Furthermore, athletes need time to adjust their weight, which can further delay title fights.

Historical double-champions of the main associations

List of double champions by country and organization

Sources
2.  Reinier De Ridder, "The Dutch Knight"
Lists of mixed martial artists
Mixed martial arts champions
Bellator MMA champions
ONE Championship champions
Ultimate Fighting Championship champions
Pride Fighting Championships champions